The , named after Edogawa Rampo, is a Japanese literary award which has been presented every year by the Mystery Writers of Japan since 1955.

Though its name is similar to the Edgar Allan Poe Awards, which has been presented by Mystery Writers of America, the Edogawa Rampo Prize is not a counterpart of the Edgar Awards. The Japanese counterparts of the Edgar awards are the Mystery Writers of Japan Awards, which honor the best in crime fiction and critical/biographical work published in the previous year.

The Edogawa Rampo Prize is an award for unpublished mystery novels. It is sponsored by Kodansha and Fuji Television. Not only is the novel of the winner, which is selected from more than 300 entries, published by Kodansha, but the winner also receives a prize of 10,000,000 yen.

The members of the 2014 selection committee are Natsuo Kirino, Natsuhiko Kyogoku, Ira Ishida, Alice Arisugawa (ja) and Bin Konno (ja), who is the current president of the Mystery Writers of Japan.

Winners 
The first and second Edogawa Rampo Prize is not the crime novel award, but an award given to persons who have made an outstanding contribution to the genre.

Finalists available in English 
Not a few finalists were published in Japan.
 18 (1972) - Misa Yamamura (ja), 
 26 (1980) - Soji Shimada,

See also 
 Japanese detective fiction
 Mystery Writers of Japan
 Edogawa Rampo
Japanese mystery awards for unpublished novels
 Ayukawa Tetsuya Award
 Mephisto Prize
 Agatha Christie Award
Japanese mystery awards for best works published in the previous year
 Mystery Writers of Japan Award
 Honkaku Mystery Award

References 

 Suekuni, Yoshimi (2000), "Edogawa Ranpo Shō". Nihon Misuteri Jiten(日本ミステリー事典), Shinchosha, Tokyo

External links 
 Mystery Writers of Japan official English website
 List of Edogawa Rampo Prize winners
 Fumio Takano Official Website

1955 establishments in Japan
Mystery and detective fiction awards
Japanese literary awards
Awards established in 1955